Simon Godfrey is an Anglican priest who currently serves as the Chancellor of St Paul's Pro-Cathedral in Valletta, Malta.

Biography
Simon Godfrey was born in London and educated in Devon at Homelands School and Britannia Royal Naval College. He studied Theology at King's College London. During this time he served on the Parochial Church Council of St Magnus-the-Martyr church in London. He also was Head Server at Westminster Abbey. He served his Curacy at the church of St Peter and Paul in Kettering, Northamptonshire before taking his first post as Rector of St Margaret's church in Crick, Northamptonshire. In 1989 he became Vicar of All Saints' Church, Northampton and rector of Northampton  in 1998. He remained in this position until January 18, 2009 when he was appointed as Chancellor of St Paul's Pro-Cathedral in Valletta succeeding Canon Tom Mendel. One of his major achievements since becoming chancellor was the restoration of the historic organ of St Paul's dating from 1694.

References

Living people
Church of England priests
21st-century English Anglican priests
Anglican clergy from London
People from Northampton
Year of birth missing (living people)